Kafr Dariyan ( also spelled Kfar Drian) is a village in Syria, administratively part of Idlib Governorate. It is situated on the northern slopes of the Harim Mountains. Nearby localities include Sarmada to the east, Killi to the south, Qurqania to the southwest and Barisha to the west. According to the Syria Central Bureau of Statistics (CBS), Kafr Dariyan had a population of 3,580 in 2004.

References

Dead Cities
Populated places in Harem District